The 1584 siege of Kanie was one of many elements in Toyotomi Hideyoshi's campaign to consolidate his power over the lands held by the Oda clan in Owari province, Japan. This event actually consisted of two sieges.

First Siege

When Hideyoshi forces came to attack Kanie castle, it was held by Maeda Tanetoshi on behalf of the Oda. However, Hideyoshi had pardoned Tanetoshi's cousin, Takigawa Kazumasu, for his support of Shibata Katsuie at Battle of Shizugatake, and as a result Kazumasu was an ally of Hideyoshi. Kazumasu negotiate and convinced his cousin, Tanetoshi, to switch sides joining Hideyoshi and giving up the castle to him. Later, Kazumasu and Tanetoshi then attempted to attack Oda's, nearby Ono castle, but they were repulsed by Oda Nagamasu, when the Oda defenders threw torches into the attackers' boats.

Second Siege

Tanetoshi and Kazumasu withdraw and returning to Kanie castle. However, they came under siege from forces loyal to the Oda's and Sakakibara clans. On behalf of the alliance between the Oda and Tokugawa clan. The Oda troops and their allies led by Oda Nagamasu, broke through the outer defenses of Kanie castle, and negotiated that they retaken the castle and would not continue the attack on the condition that they gave Maeda Tanetoshi head. Later, when Maeda Tanetoshi attempted to escape, he was killed by his cousin, Takigawa Kazumasu, who provided Tanetoshi head to the Oda commanders.

References

Kanie
Kanie
1584 in Japan
Conflicts in 1584